Ghul or Wadi Ghul is an abandoned village, located to the northwest of Al Hamra in Oman. The area is referred to as the "Omani Grand Canyon" or "The Grand Canyon of Arabia". It is near Jebel Shams, the highest mountain peak in Oman.

References

External links
Photograph
The Road to Wadi Ghul — The Grand Canyon of Oman by Brian Cohen

Former populated places in Oman
Archaeological sites in Oman